Pápoc is a village in Vas county, Hungary.

Sightseeing for visitors: the old rotunda of Árpád age
In the village there is an old architectural heritage from the romanesque art: the old rotunda. It was built in the 13th century. The inner space consists of four apses surrounding a central circular space. The rotunda has two floors: the stairs go up in a corridor inside the wall. The rotunda is built together with a monastery of St. Agustino Order. It has beautiful southern doorway.

Outer references
 Gervers-Molnár, V. (1972): A középkori Magyarország rotundái. (Rotunda in the Medieval Hungary). Akadémiai, Budapest
 Gerevich Tibor: Magyarország románkori emlékei. (Die romanische Denkmäler Ungarns.) Egyetemi nyomda. Budapest, 1938. 
 Henszlmann, I. (1876): Magyarország ó-keresztyén, román és átmeneti stylü mű-emlékeinek rövid ismertetése, (Old-Christian, Romanesque and Transitional Style Architecture in Hungary). Királyi Magyar Egyetemi Nyomda, Budapest 
 Bedy Vince: A pápóci prépostság és perjelség története. [Geschichte der Probstei und des Priorates Pápocz.] (Gyõregyházmegye Múltjából, 6.) Gyõr, 1939. 
 Csányi Károly: A pápóci négykarélyos, emeletes kápolna mûszaki leírása. [Die technische Beschreibung der vierpassförmigen Geschosskapelle zu Pápóc.] In: Bedy Vince: A pápóci prépostság és perjelség története. [Geschichte der Probstei und des Priorates Pápocz.] (Gyõregyházmegye Múltjából, 6.) Gyõr, 1939. 119–124. p.

References

Populated places in Vas County
Romanesque architecture in Hungary